Rear Admiral George Dunbar Moore,  (10 October 1893 – 27 July 1979) was a senior commander in the Royal Australian Navy and a diplomat.

Moore was appointed Australia's first Minister to the Philippines in 1950, leaving his position as naval flag officer in charge of Sydney to take up the post in Manila. In 1954, Moore made front-page news in the Philippines when local media claimed he lashed out at security officers at his residence. Moore retired from the position a year later in July 1955.

References

1893 births
1979 deaths
Ambassadors of Australia to the Philippines
Australian Commanders of the Order of the British Empire
Australian military personnel of World War I
Australian military personnel of World War II
People from Central Queensland
Royal Australian Navy admirals
Royal Navy officers
Royal Naval Reserve personnel